Jason Scott Miller is an American businessman currently serving as Chief Performance Officer of the United States and deputy director of the Office of Management and Budget for management.

Education 
Miller graduated with a B.A. from the University of Pennsylvania, M.B.A. from the Kellogg School of Management at Northwestern University, and a M.P.A. from Harvard University.

Career 
Miller served in the Obama Administration as deputy assistant to the president and deputy director of the National Economic Council, where he focused on economic development, manufacturing, infrastructure, tax policy, and energy. Before entering government he was a management consultant with the  Boston Consulting Group and Marakon Associates.

References

Living people
Year of birth missing (living people)
Biden administration personnel
Deputy Directors for Management of the Office of Management and Budget
Harvard Kennedy School alumni
Kellogg School of Management alumni
University of Pennsylvania alumni